Pradeep John, popularly known as the Tamil Nadu Weatherman, is an Indian amateur weather forecasting enthusiast and blogger from Tamil Nadu. His forecasts are more closely followed by and the other people of Chennai than the forecasts published by the India Meteorological Department during the monsoon season. He began blogging about weather and rainfall in 2008. In 2014, he started publishing on social media. His social media popularity increased after his accurate predictions during the 2015 Chennai floods.

Early life
Pradeep John was born in Kanyakumari district in South Tamil Nadu and lives in Chennai. His interest in weather began at age 12.  He did his schooling at SBOA Matriculation School and graduated with a B.E. in Computer science and Engineering from Sathyabama University. He also holds an MBA in finance from Madras University. Pradeep John is married to Hannah Shalini; the couple has a daughter.

Career
In 2008, Pradeep John joined India Infolines as a relationship manager.  Currently, he works as a deputy manager at Tamil Nadu Urban Infrastructure Financial Services Limited (TNUIFSL).

Awards and honours
 2018: Inspirational Achiever award
 2019: Inspirational Role Model Award

References

External links
Official Website

1982 births
Living people
Engineers from Tamil Nadu
Indian Tamil academics
People from Kanyakumari district